Ristocetin is a glycopeptide antibiotic, obtained from Amycolatopsis lurida, previously used to treat staphylococcal infections. It is no longer used clinically because it caused thrombocytopenia and platelet agglutination.  It is now used solely to assay those functions in vitro in the diagnosis of conditions such as von Willebrand disease (vWD) and Bernard–Soulier syndrome.  Platelet agglutination caused by ristocetin can occur only in the presence of von Willebrand factor multimers, so if ristocetin is added to blood lacking the factor (or its receptor—see below), the platelets will not clump.

Through an unknown mechanism, the antibiotic ristocetin causes von Willebrand factor to bind the platelet receptor glycoprotein Ib (GpIb), so when ristocetin is added to normal blood, it causes agglutination.

In some types of vWD (types 2B and platelet-type), even very small amounts of ristocetin cause platelet aggregation when the patient's platelet-rich plasma is used.  This paradox is explained by these types having gain-of-function mutations which cause the vWD high molecular-weight multimers to bind more tightly to their receptors on platelets (the alpha chains of glycoprotein Ib (GPIb) receptors).  In the case of type 2B vWD, the gain-of-function mutation involves von Willebrand's factor (VWF gene), and in platelet-type vWD, the receptor is the object of the mutation (GPIb).  This increased binding causes vWD because the high-molecular weight multimers are removed from circulation in plasma since they remain attached to the patient's platelets.  Thus, if the patient's platelet-poor plasma is used, the ristocetin cofactor assay will not agglutinate standardized platelets (i.e., pooled platelets from normal donors that are fixed in formalin), similar to the other types of vWD.

In all forms of the ristocetin assay, the platelets are fixed in formalin prior to the assay to prevent von Willebrand's factor stored in platelet granules from being released and participating in platelet aggregation.  Thus, the ristocetin cofactor activity depends only upon high-molecular multimers of the factor present in circulating plasma.

References

Antibiotics
Glycopeptide antibiotics
Chemical pathology